Italy has had a national curling championship since 1955.

See also
Italian Mixed Curling Championship
Italian Mixed Doubles Curling Championship

Curling competitions in Italy
1955 establishments in Italy
Recurring sporting events established in 1955
Curling
National curling championships